Melaleuca osullivanii is a plant in the myrtle family, Myrtaceae and is endemic to the south-west of Western Australia. It was first formally described in 2004 after a review of the broombush group, Melaleuca uncinata. It differs from others in the group by having leaves that are fine and circular in cross section.

Description

The flowers are creamy white and are arranged in heads containing 4 to 9 groups of flowers in threes. The stamens are arranged in five bundles around the flower, each bundle with 3 to 5 stamens. Flowering occurs in November and December and is followed by fruit which are woody capsules tightly packed together so that they appear like a single oval-shaped fruit  in diameter.

Taxonomy and naming
Melaleuca osullivanii was first formally described in 2004 by Lyndley Craven and Brendan Lepschi in Australian Systematic Botany. The specific epithet (osullivanii) is a reference to Wayne O'Sullivan who has contributed to studies of Melaleuca species in the field.

Distribution and habitat
This melaleuca occurs in and between the Perth, and Busselton districts in the Jarrah Forest and Swan Coastal Plain biogeographic regions. It often grows in sand in association with other heathy species of Melaleuca, Hakea, Grevillea and introduced grasses in areas close to the coast that are wet in winter.

Conservation
Melaleuca osullivanii is listed as "not threatened" by the Government of Western Australia Department of Parks and Wildlife.

References

osullivanii
Plants described in 2004
Endemic flora of Western Australia
Taxa named by Lyndley Craven